Branford High School can refer to:

Branford High School (Connecticut)
Branford High School (Florida)